Rafflesia bengkuluensis is a relatively new parasitic plant species of the genus Rafflesia. It is native to the Indonesian island of Sumatra. It was discovered after extensive research of R. arnoldii by the Department of Forest University of Bengkulu when they noticed some organisms being significantly smaller and were eventually classified as a separate species.

References

External links
 Parasitic Plant Connection: Rafflesia bengkuluensis page

bengkuluensis
Endemic flora of Sumatra